Genetic codes is a simple ASN.1 database hosted by the National Center for Biotechnology Information and listing all the known Genetic codes.

See also
Genetic code

References

External links
 https://www.ncbi.nlm.nih.gov/Taxonomy/Utils/wprintgc.cgi
 ftp://ftp.ncbi.nih.gov/entrez/misc/data/gc.prt

Biological databases
Molecular genetics
Gene expression
Protein biosynthesis